Nanuza plicata is a plant species in the family Velloziaceae, endemic to Brazil.

Nanuza  plicata contains amentoflavone and xerophytolic acid.

References

External links 

Velloziaceae
Endemic flora of Brazil
Plants described in 1823